is the 43rd single by Japanese entertainer Akina Nakamori. Written by Kim Hyung-seok and Minako Kawae, the single was released on May 12, 2004, by Utahime Records.

Background 
"Akai Hana" is a Japanese-language cover of South Korean singer Park Yong-ha's 2003 single "Cheoeum Geu Nalcheoleom" (처음 그 날처럼, lit. "Like the First Day"). It was also the first release through Nakamori's own label Utahime Records, with distribution by Universal Music Japan.

Chart performance 
"Akai Hana" peaked at No. 40 on Oricon's weekly singles chart and sold over 5,100 copies.

Track listing

Charts

References

External links 
 
 

2004 singles
2004 songs
Akina Nakamori songs
Japanese-language songs
Universal Music Japan singles